Lali Kandelaki (Georgian: ლალი კანდელაკი) (born September 9, 1972) is a Georgian ballerina with the State Ballet of Georgia.

Biography
Kandelaki was born in Tbilisi, Georgia, and trained under Vakhtang Chabukiani, Nina Didebulidze and Margarita Grishkevich. She debuted in Sergei Prokofiev's Cinderella at the Tbilisi's Z. Paliashvili Opera and Ballet Professional State Theatre, where her repertoire included Odette-Odile in Swan Lake, Gamzatti in La Bayadere, Javara in Gorda, and Kitri  in Don Quixote. Kandelaki appeared in George Aleksidze's Symphonic Dances at the 1997 Edinburgh International Festival.

She became principal dancer of Turkey's Mersin Opera and Ballet Theatre in 1997. Until 2003 she played lead roles in N. Maghalashvili's stagings of Carmen, Porgy and Bess, Giselle, Le Corasaire (Medora), One thousand and one nights, and Romeo and Juliette.

She has been a prima ballerina at the Z. Paliashvili State Theatre since 2003, and was company manager between 2011 and 2013.

In 2008 she toured with the Royal Swedish Ballet in China, where her performance as Odette-Odile from Swan Lake reportedly included 32 double fouettés.

Awards
 2009: Georgian Order of Honor in 2009
 2000: Gold and first prize at the Varna International Ballet Competition
 Vakhtang Chabukiani Medal

References

Prima ballerinas
Ballerinas from Georgia (country)
1972 births
Living people
Female dancers from Tbilisi
Recipients of the Order of Honor (Georgia)